Gabe Nabers (born November 5, 1997) is an American football fullback who is a free agent. He played college football at Florida State.

Early life and high school
Nabers attended and played high school football at Lowndes High School. As a senior, he was named the Georgia 1-6A Utility Player of the Year after finishing the season with 17 receptions for 173 yards and six touchdowns with 26 tackles, 4.5 tackles for loss, one sack, one interception, two pass breakups and a blocked kick on defense. Nabers was rated a two-star recruit and originally committed to play college football at Georgia Southern before de-committing and signing to play at Florida State after receiving an offer from the school.

College career
Nabers was a member of the Florida State Seminoles for four seasons. He played mostly on special teams for his first two seasons and scored a touchdown on his first career reception as a sophomore against Delaware State. As a senior, he had 15 catches for 221 yards and two touchdowns. He finished his collegiate career with 19 receptions for 269 yards and three touchdowns.

Professional career
Nabers was signed by the Los Angeles Chargers as an undrafted free agent on April 25, 2020. He was waived on September 5, 2020, and signed to the practice squad the next day. The Chargers elevated Nabers to their active roster on September 12, 2020, and he made his NFL debut the next day against the Cincinnati Bengals. He reverted to the practice squad on September 14. He was promoted to the active roster on September 17. Nabers rushed for four yards on his first career carry and caught a five-yard pass from Justin Herbert for his first career reception in a 38–31 loss to the Tampa Bay Buccaneers on October 4, 2020. In Week 8, against the Denver Broncos, he scored his first professional touchdown on a two-yard pass in the 31–30 loss.

On August 30, 2022, Nabers was waived by the Chargers.

References

External links
Florida State Seminoles bio
Los Angeles Chargers bio

Living people
1997 births
American football fullbacks
Los Angeles Chargers players
Florida State Seminoles football players
Players of American football from Georgia (U.S. state)
People from Valdosta, Georgia